

Overview
The school caters for ages 11–19 and was established in 1961. The current number of children on roll is approximately 1000 pupils with a teaching staff of 64. The headteacher is Mrs. Kathryn Bell. The school buildings were enlarged and modernised in 1993.

The school is linked with Toyama National College of Maritime Technology and this connection has been in existence for over ten years.

In 2009, the school received a funding of £1,776 from the charity Business in the Community as part of the programme "Adopt a School". The funding will allow pupils from year 11 to partake in self-improvement and business awareness programmes as well as past pupil presentations.

In 2011, Ballyclare Secondary School began celebrating its 50th anniversary. In 2018, the school received the Top Investor in Careers National Quality Award recognised by Ofsted.

References 

Secondary schools in County Antrim
Educational institutions established in 1961
1961 establishments in Northern Ireland
Ballyclare